The Revue d’histoire moderne et contemporaine ("Review of modern and contemporary history") is a three-monthly French academic journal covering the history of France. It was established in 1899 by Pierre Caron and Philippe Sagnac and is published by the Société d’histoire moderne et contemporaine.

Title history 
The journal was published under the title Revue d'histoire moderne et contemporaine from 1899 to 1914. From 1926-1940 the journal was published under the title Revue d'histoire moderne. Seven years later, the journal resumed under the title Etudes d'histoire moderne et contemporaine, published from 1947-1953. In 1954, the journal changed names back to Revue d'histoire moderne et contemporaine, and was published until 2011.

References

External links

 Revue d'histoire moderne et contemporaine  - Éditions Belin (Archive, 2001-2010)

Publications established in 1899
Historiography of France
Quarterly journals
French history journals
French-language journals